is a Japanese anime screenwriter.

Filmography

Anime television

2000s
Ground Defense Force! Mao-chan (2002), Script
Bottle Fairy (2003), Script
Maburaho (2003–04), Script
Yumeria (2004), Series composition (with Yōsuke Kuroda), Script
Ah My Buddha (2005), Series composition, Script
Amaenaide yo!! Katsu!! (2006), Series composition, Script
Ah! My Goddess: Flights of Fancy (2006), Script
Utawarerumono (2006), Series composition, Script
My Bride Is a Mermaid (2007), Series Composition, Script
School Days (2007), Series Composition, Script
Sola (2007), Script
Akaneiro ni Somaru Saka (2008), Series Composition, Script
Astro Fighter Sunred (2008), Series Composition, Script
Astro Fighter Sunred Season 2 (2009), Series Composition, Script
Tayutama: Kiss on my Deity (2009), Series Composition, Script

2010s
Katanagatari (2010), Series Composition, Script
The Qwaser of Stigmata (2010), Series Composition, Script
Carnival Phantasm (2011), Series Composition, Script
Is This a Zombie? (2011), Series Composition, Script
Kamisama Dolls (2011), Series Composition, Script
The Qwaser of Stigmata II (2011), Series Composition, Script
The Legend of Heroes: Trails in the Sky OVA (2011), Script
Humanity Has Declined (2012), Series Composition, Script
Is This a Zombie? of the Dead (2012), Series Composition, Script
Space Brothers (2012–2014), Series Composition, Script
Devil Survivor 2: The Animation (2013), Series Composition, Script
Danganronpa: The Animation (2013), Series Composition, Script
Arpeggio of Blue Steel (2013), Series Composition, Script
D-Frag! (2014), Series Composition, Script
Akame ga Kill! (2014), Series Composition, Script
Yuki Yuna is a Hero (2014), Series Composition, Script
Assassination Classroom (2015), Series Composition, Script
Rampo Kitan: Game of Laplace (2015), Series Composition, Script
The Heroic Legend of Arslan (2015), Series Composition, Script
Wooser's Hand-to-Mouth Life: Phantasmagoric Arc (2015), Script
Assassination Classroom Final Season (2016), Series Composition, Script
KonoSuba (2016), Series Composition, Script
The Heroic Legend of Arslan: Dust Storm Dance (2016), Series Composition
KonoSuba 2 (2017), Series Composition, Script
Scum's Wish (2017), Series Composition, Script
Boruto: Naruto Next Generations (2017), Script
Yuki Yuna is a Hero: Washio Sumi Chapter (2017), Series Composition, Script
Yuki Yuna is a Hero: Hero Chapter (2017), Series Composition, Script
Radiant (2018), Script
Kengan Ashura (2019), Script
Radiant Season 2 (2019), Script

2020s
Drifting Dragons (2020), Series Composition
Fate/Grand Carnival (2021), Series Composition, Script
Yuki Yuna is a Hero: The Great Mankai Chapter (2021), Series Composition, Script
Rumble Garanndoll (2021), Series Composition, Script
Play It Cool, Guys (2022), Series Composition
KonoSuba: An Explosion on This Wonderful World! (2023), Series Composition
KonoSuba 3 (TBA), Series Composition

References

External links

Living people
Japanese screenwriters
Anime screenwriters
People from Osaka Prefecture
Year of birth missing (living people)